The Academy Award for Best Supporting Actor is an award presented annually by the Academy of Motion Picture Arts and Sciences (AMPAS). It is given in honor of an actor who has delivered an outstanding performance in a supporting role while working within the film industry. The award is traditionally presented by the previous year's Best Supporting Actress winner.

At the 9th Academy Awards ceremony held in 1937, Walter Brennan was the first winner of this award for his role in Come and Get It. Initially, winners in both supporting acting categories were awarded plaques instead of statuettes. Beginning with the 16th ceremony held in 1944, however, winners received full-sized statuettes. Currently, nominees are determined by single transferable vote within the actors branch of AMPAS; winners are selected by a plurality vote from the entire eligible voting members of the Academy.

Since its inception, the award has been given to 78 actors. Brennan has received the most awards in this category with three awards. Brennan, Jeff Bridges, Robert Duvall, Arthur Kennedy, Jack Nicholson, Claude Rains, and Al Pacino were each nominated four times, more than any other actors. As of the 2023 ceremony, Ke Huy Quan is the most recent winner in this category for his performance as Waymond Wang in Everything Everywhere All at Once.

Winners and nominees
In the following table, the years are listed as per Academy convention, and generally correspond to the year of film release in Los Angeles County; the ceremonies are always held the following year.

1930s

1940s

1950s

1960s

1970s

1980s

1990s

2000s

2010s

2020s

Multiple wins and nominations

The following individuals received two or more Best Supporting Actor awards:

The following individuals received three or more Best Supporting Actor nominations:

Age superlatives

See also 
 All Academy Award acting nominees
 List of awards for supporting actor

Notes

References

Bibliography

External links 
 Oscars.org (official Academy website)
 The Academy Awards Database (official website)
 Oscar.com (official ceremony promotional website)

Academy Awards
Best Supporting Actor Academy Award winners
Film awards for supporting actor